Utvær Lighthouse is the westernmost coastal lighthouse in Norway.  It is located in the western part of Solund municipality in Vestland county.

History
It was first lit in 1900 and it was listed as a protected site in 1999. The surrounding area is protected as a nature reserve. It is located on a small, rocky island about  due west of the island of Ytre Sula.  The site is accessible only by boat, but guided tours are available.

The lighthouse marks the line of transition between the North Sea to the southwest and the Norwegian Sea to the northwest. The light station was heavily damaged in an air raid during World War II in 1945. Many of the buildings were burned, but the historic tower was spared.

Utvær lighthouse is currently displayed on the 50-kroner Norwegian banknote.

Gallery

See also

Lighthouses in Norway
List of lighthouses in Norway

References

External links

 Norsk Fyrhistorisk Forening 

Lighthouses completed in 1900
Lighthouses in Vestland
Listed lighthouses in Norway
Solund